Rodney Rude (born Rodney Malcolm Keft, 29 January 1943 in Nowra, New South Wales, Australia) is an Australian-born blue stand-up comedian, poet, writer, and musician. 

Rude is best known for his bawdy humour and has released 12 albums and five videos all distributed locally by EMI Records. Rude has been nominated for the ARIA Award for Best Comedy Release nine times between 1987 and 2009, and has won two Mo Awards. He officially retired from performing live shows on 9 December 2016.

Early career
Rude began his career performing with travelling tent shows on the showground circuit in the early 1960s, singing and playing guitar. His habit of altering the lyrics of songs to amuse himself and his audience prompted him to become a comedian. He left Australia in the mid-1960s to tour the world, and to live and work in the United States, Canada, and Europe under various stage names. In 1981, he was asked by Barry Wain to return to Australia to set up Sydney's Comedy Store, and started working as the club's compere.

Style
Rude's comedy is energetic and aggressive, peppered with expletives and his trademark rat-tat-tat laugh, and typically suitable for adult audiences only. Recurring stage props often included a small ukulele for short musical pieces, hats too small for his head, oversized clown shoes, metal tea strainers used to imitate a fly (insect) and material from his grandfather's joke album. There were several regular characters that appeared in his act; most notably 'Bishop Rude' while wielding a toilet plunger, 'Harry Muff (The Diver)' - where Rodney would dress in a shirt to below his waist and short pants with belt around his knees - and 'Half Rude', where Rodney would bend himself at the knees into a fabricated set of prosthetic legs with foam around his backside to create a false pair of buttocks. He would regularly 'pivot'; a twist of his upper body and head to one side accompanied by a howl of, "naaaaahhhh!". Rodney's interaction with his audiences is a key part of his act, including the famous 'limericks' toward the end of each show. Positive hecklers were frequent at any Rude Concert because his quick-fire responses were an integral part of his act, making it something of a badge of honour to have Rodney heckle you as an audience member. His catch-phrase "You know what I hate?" preceding some of his jokes was always responded to by the audience calling out in unison,
"What do you hate Rodney!?"

Discography

Live and compilation albums

Video albums

Awards

ARIA Music Awards
The ARIA Music Awards is an annual awards ceremony that recognises excellence, innovation, and achievement across all genres of Australian music. Rude has been nominated for ten awards.

|-
| rowspan="2"| 1987
| rowspan="2"| Rude Rides Again
| rowspan="1"| Best Comedy Release
| 
|-
| ARIA Award for Highest Selling Album
| 
|-
| 1989
| Not Guilty
| rowspan="8"| Best Comedy Release
| 
|-
| 1992
| A Legend
| 
|-
| 1999
| More Grunt
| 
|-
| 2001
| Ya Mum's Bum
| 
|-
| 2003
| Rude Bastard
| 
|-
| 2005
| Twice As Rude
| 
|-
| 2007
| Frog Sack
| 
|-
| 2009
| Rodney Rude Goes the Growl
| 
|}

Mo Awards
The Australian Entertainment Mo Awards (commonly known informally as the Mo Awards), were annual Australian entertainment industry awards. They recognise achievements in live entertainment in Australia from 1975 to 2016. Rodney Rude won two awards in that time.
 (wins only)
|-
| 1985
| Rodney Rude
| Best Comedy Act of the Year
| 
|-
| 2006
| Rodney Rude
| Outstanding Contribution to Australian Comedy
| 
|-

References

External links

Rodney Rude at Musichead.com.au (run by his record company, EMI)

1943 births
20th-century Australian comedians
20th-century Australian male musicians
20th-century Australian male singers
20th-century Australian male writers
20th-century Australian non-fiction writers
20th-century Australian poets
21st-century Australian comedians
21st-century Australian male musicians
21st-century Australian male singers
21st-century Australian male writers
21st-century Australian non-fiction writers
21st-century Australian poets
Australian expatriates in Canada
Australian expatriates in the United States
Australian male guitarists
Australian male non-fiction writers
Australian male poets
Australian male singers
Australian satirists
Australian songwriters
Australian stand-up comedians
EMI Records artists
Humorous poets
Living people
People from Nowra